GEU may refer to:
 Geu, a commune in France
 Glendale Municipal Airport, in Arizona
 Graphic Era, a university in Uttarakhand, India